The Rod El Farag Axis Bridge or simply Tahya Misr Bridge is a cable-stayed bridge over the Nile river located in the region of Rod El Farag crossing through Cairo, Egypt. It was built by the Arab Contractors. With a width of 67.3 meters, the bridge holds the Guinness World Record for the world's widest cable-stayed bridge.

Because of its location, the bridge has become a major tourist attraction in Cairo, where visitors can cross the side pedestrian passageways which have panoramic views of the banks of the Nile and a glass flooring see-through walkway where visitors can walk over the Nile.

Construction 
The bridge was built over the course of four years. 4,000 individuals including engineers, technicians and workers took part in the construction. It was completed in 2019 and inaugurated by President Sisi. According to Ihab Alphar, the chairman of the AFEA, the basic cost of the project reached 170 billion Egyptian pounds (9.94 billion U.S. dollars).

The Bridge is 540 meters long and has 6 lanes in both directions. Its suspension towers are 92 meters high with 160 suspension cables.

References

External links 

 Plaque of recognition by the Guinness World Records

Bridges in Cairo
Cable-stayed bridges in Egypt
Bridges completed in 2019
21st-century architecture in Egypt